Amedeo P. Giorgi is an American psychologist known for his contributions to phenomenology and humanistic psychology. He developed the Descriptive Phenomenological Method in Psychology.

Career
Giorgi received his PhD in experimental psychology from Fordham University in 1958. After working as a human factors consultant to government and industry for several years, Giorgi moved into an academic career, beginning at Manhattan College, followed by Duquesne University, and later the University of Quebec at Montreal.

He is a professor at Saybrook University in San Francisco, with which he has been associated since 1986. Becoming critical of mainstream psychology after obtaining his PhD, Giorgi began to seek alternative approaches to the study of psychological material. In so doing, he studied philosophical phenomenology, especially the work of Edmund Husserl and Maurice Merleau-Ponty, and adopted that approach as a framework for developing an alternative approach to the understanding of psychological problems. Giorgi's speciality is in the area of psychological research practices, especially qualitative research approaches. He is the developer of a phenomenological method (The Descriptive Phenomenological Method in Psychology) based on the thought of Husserl and Merleau-Ponty. He has directed over 100 dissertations that have used the method on a wide variety of psychological problems, and he has published over 100 articles on the phenomenological approach to psychology. Giorgi has lectured on phenomenological psychology in Europe, Asia, Latin America, Australia and South Africa. He is the founder and original editor (for over 25 years) of the Journal of Phenomenological Psychology and is author of the classic text 'Psychology as a Human Science: A Phenomenologically based Approach' (New York: Harper & Row, 1970). In addition, he has published, inter alia, 'Phenomenology and Psychological Research' (Pittsburgh, PA: Duquesne University Press, 1985 - Editor) and 'Qualitative Research in Psychology' (Pittsburgh, PA: Duquesne University Press, 1986 - Editor, with P. D. Ashworth & A. J. J. de Koning).

Giorgi and Adrian Van Kaam were founding members of the "Duquesne School" of psychology, where he began formalizing phenomenological methods for psychology. He was a key figure in the history of the humanistic psychology movement, alongside such notable pioneers as Carl Rogers and Fritz Perls. He is a noted historian of the field of psychology, particularly alternative strands.

In May 2010, he was the invited speaker of the annual conference of the Interdisciplinary Coalition of North American Phenomenologists.

References 

Living people
21st-century American psychologists
Phenomenologists
Saybrook University faculty
Year of birth missing (living people)